Mogens Vilhelm Thomassen (September 24, 1914 – April 29, 1987) was a Danish field hockey player who competed in the 1936 Summer Olympics.

He was born in Hellerup, Gentofte.

In 1936 he was a member of the Danish team which was eliminated in the group stage of the Olympic tournament. He played both matches as halfback.

External links
 
profile

1914 births
1987 deaths
Danish male field hockey players
Olympic field hockey players of Denmark
Field hockey players at the 1936 Summer Olympics
People from Gentofte Municipality
Sportspeople from the Capital Region of Denmark